Anton Kol (born 31 May 1990) is a Ukrainian Paralympic swimmer competing in S1-classification events. He won two silver medals at the 2020 Summer Paralympics held in Tokyo, Japan. He also represented Ukraine at the 2016 Summer Paralympics held in Rio de Janeiro, Brazil and he won the bronze medals in the men's 50 metre backstroke S1 and men's 100 metre backstroke S1 events.

Career 
At the 2013 IPC Swimming World Championships he won the silver medal in the men's 50 metre backstroke S1 event and the bronze medal in the men's 100 metre freestyle S1 event.

At the 2014 IPC Swimming European Championships he won the bronze medal in the men's 100 metre freestyle S1 event, the bronze medal in the men's 50 metre freestyle S1 event and the silver medal in the men's 50 metre backstroke S1 event.

At the 2015 IPC Swimming World Championships he won the silver medal in the men's 50 metre backstroke S1 event and also the silver medal in the men's 100 metre backstroke S1 event.

He won the bronze medal in the men's 100 metres backstroke S2 event at the 2018 World Para Swimming European Championships held in Dublin, Ireland. He also finished in 4th place in the men's 50 metres backstroke S2 competition.

References

External links 

 

Living people
1990 births
Place of birth missing (living people)
Swimmers at the 2016 Summer Paralympics
Swimmers at the 2020 Summer Paralympics
Medalists at the 2016 Summer Paralympics
Medalists at the 2020 Summer Paralympics
Medalists at the World Para Swimming Championships
Paralympic silver medalists for Ukraine
Paralympic bronze medalists for Ukraine
Paralympic medalists in swimming
S1-classified Paralympic swimmers
People with arthrogryposis
Paralympic swimmers of Ukraine
Ukrainian male backstroke swimmers
21st-century Ukrainian people